Kristen Elena Romano (born September 24, 1999) is an American born Puerto Rican swimmer. She competed at the 2019 World Aquatics Championships. At the 2018 Central American and Caribbean Games she won three medals (2 gold and 1 bronze).

Major Results

Individual

Long course

Relay

Long course

Personal bests

This list include only above 750 Swimming points time.

References

External links

 Ohio State Buckeyes bio

1999 births
Living people
People from Lancaster, New York
Puerto Rican female swimmers
Competitors at the 2018 Central American and Caribbean Games
Central American and Caribbean Games gold medalists for Puerto Rico
Central American and Caribbean Games bronze medalists for Puerto Rico
Ohio State Buckeyes women's swimmers
Central American and Caribbean Games medalists in swimming